Percy Peter Tshidiso Qoboza was an influential black South African journalist, author, and outspoken critic of the apartheid government in South Africa during the early periods of world recognition of the problems evident in the racially divided land.  His eloquent editorials did much to challenge white South Africans who were shielded from the horrors of apartheid as experienced by millions of black South Africans at the hands of the minority government.

Early life 
Born in the black ghetto of Sophiatown to a Xhosa family, he experienced the harsh realities of oppression and discrimination in his homeland when the entire township was destroyed in 1952 in an apartheid cleansing of the area.  Many of the residents were packed up and carted off in open trucks.

He later used this and many other experiences to excel at Lesotho University where he earned a degree in theology, but later returned home to complete studies in journalism.

Career as an editor 
As editor of The World newspaper in Soweto from 1974 until the late 1970s, he gave the world a unique and powerful view of the Soweto riots which broke out on 16 June 1976.  Under Qoboza, The World became a much sought-after publication. As a source of news and information on the black political front, it was gospel; to the government, it was seen as the enemy.

His editorial column "Percy's Pitch" was highly anticipated.  Under his direction, The World'''s circulation increased to become the most read newspaper by blacks in the country.  This allowed views to be shaped during the period when many young black radicals where formed and saw the need for change immediately.

This powerful voice was seen as a threat to the minority government and many attacks and threats were made against Qoboza and his family.  Finally on 19 October 1977, The World offices were closed and the paper was banned.  Qoboza and scores of others were thrown into jail for 6 months without trial.  His family had no way to communicate with him and had no way to know if he was alive.  When he was released, he was eventually told to leave the country. He was invited to the United States and he traveled to Washington, D.C. and worked with the Washington Star in 1980.

He was returning to the United States after he was initially nominated as South Africa's Nieman Fellow at Harvard University in September 1975. The time he spent in Cambridge would continue to shape his voice and allow him to build strong bridges with journalists from all over the world.

He returned to South Africa and became the editor of City Press in 1984.  Again his sharp style gave a strong, passionate voice to the ongoing struggle to end oppression.  He failed to see the end of his life's work having died in 1988 on his 50th birthday, after suffering a heart attack on Christmas Day in 1987 and slipping into a coma.  His funeral was attended by over 5000 mourners including many of the leaders of the struggle in South Africa (including Winnie Mandela and Nthato Motlana, the United States Ambassador Edward Perkins, and press from around the world.

In 2000, Qoboza was named as one of the International Press Institute's 50 World Press Freedom Heroes of the past 50 years.

 Percy Qoboza Award 

The National Association of Black Journalists in the United States awards an annual honor to the journalist who best exemplifies the spirit of Qoboza.  From their website, "Awarded to a foreign journalist who has done extraordinary work while overcoming tremendous obstacles that contributes to the enrichment, understanding or advancement of people or issues in the African diaspora. The honor is not open to journalists working for American-based publications."

 Winners 

2018 – Chika Oduah, Voice of America
2017 – Wesley Gibbings 
2011 – Jean-Claude Kavumbagu, Net Press
2008 – Imprisoned Journalists of Eritrea
2007 – National Union of Somali Journalists
2006 – Deyda Hydara, & Members of the Gambian Press Union (Posthumous)
2005 – Michele Montas, Haiti
2004 – Pius Njawe, Cameroon
2003 – Geoffrey Nyarota, The Daily News, Zimbabwe 
2002 – Milkias Mihreteab Yohannes, Eritrea
2000 – Rafael Marques, Angola
1999 – Fred Mmembe, The Post, Zambia
1997 – Marie-Roger Biloa, Africa International magazine, Paris
1996 – Babacar Fall, Pan-African News Agency, Senegal
1995 – Kenneth Best, The Daily Observer, Liberia
1994 – Zubeida Jaffer, Cape Town, South Africa
1989 – Zwelake Sisulu, New Nation'', South Africa

References

External links
 https://web.archive.org/web/20010523174122/http://www.nieman.harvard.edu/reports/99-4_00-1NR/Pather_In_Memoriam.html
 http://www.nabj.org/awards/honors/index.html

1938 births
1988 deaths
People from Johannesburg
Xhosa people
Anti-apartheid activists
Nieman Fellows
South African journalists
South African newspaper editors
20th-century journalists